Comstock is an unincorporated community located in Barron County, Wisconsin, United States. Comstock is located on U.S. Route 63 southwest of Cumberland, in the town of Crystal Lake. Comstock has a post office with ZIP code 54826.

History
A post office called Comstock has been in operation since 1881. The community was named for H. S. Comstock, a Wisconsin judge.

References

Unincorporated communities in Barron County, Wisconsin
Unincorporated communities in Wisconsin